The 1971 Arizona State Sun Devils football team represented Arizona State University in the 1971 NCAA University Division football season.  The offense scored 462 points while the defense allowed 201 points. Led by head coach Frank Kush, the Sun Devils won the Fiesta Bowl.

Schedule

Roster

1972 NFL Draft
The following players were claimed in the 1972 NFL Draft.

References

Arizona State
Arizona State Sun Devils football seasons
Western Athletic Conference football champion seasons
Fiesta Bowl champion seasons
Arizona State Sun Devils football